Olstappen is a lake in Nord-Fron Municipality in Innlandet county, Norway. The southeastern shore of the lake forms the municipal border with Sør-Fron Municipality.

The Vinstra river, coming from the southwest, flows into the west side of Olstappen and flows out of Olstappen's northeast corner, and from there it heads east into the Gudbrandsdalslågen river at the town of Vinstra. The Espa River flows into Olstappen from the south, making it a tributary of the Vinstra.

See also
List of lakes in Norway

References

Nord-Fron
Sør-Fron
Lakes of Innlandet
Reservoirs in Norway